Cape Farewell is a headland on the southern shore of Egger Island, Nunap Isua Archipelago, Greenland. As the southernmost point of the country, it is one of the important landmarks of Greenland.

Geography
Egger and the associated minor islands are known as the Cape Farewell Archipelago. The area is part of the Kujalleq municipality. King Frederick VI Coast stretches from Cape Farewell to Pikiulleq Bay (former spelling 'Pikiutdleq') in the north along the eastern coast of Greenland.

Climate

See also
List of countries by southernmost point

References

External links
 Aerial photographs of the Kap Farvel area
 Ketilidian structure and the rapakivi suite between Lindenow Fjord and Kap Farvel, South-East Greenland

Farewell
Kujalleq